Kharatara Gaccha is one of Shvetambara Murtipujaka Gacchas. It is also called the Vidhisangha (the Assembly) or Vidhimarga (Path of Proper Conduct), as they regard their practices as scripturally correct.

History

Kharatara Gaccha was founded by Vardhamana Sūri (till 1031). His pupil, Jineshvara, got honorary title 'Kharatara' (Sharp witted or Fierce) because he defeated Suracharya, leader of Chaityavasis in public debate in 1023 at Anahilvada Patan. So the Gaccha also got his title. Khartara also means that "which is beyond" (tara) "purity" (khara), that is, being upright with the absolute truth, by following the religious scriptures without deviation (Jain Agamas) as it is. Another tradition regards Jinadatta Suri (1075-1154) as a founder of Gaccha.

In the Khartara tradition, there have been numerous influential and masterly ascetics, who researched and developed extensively in the fields of literature, astrology, history, Ayurveda, right way of perception among various topics that they explored. This includes the right way of meditation, Satya Sadhna, which has been followed by all the ascetics within and beyond the Khartara tradition. These books were not only for Jainism, or even for India, they were meant for the whole world. Jineshvara Sūri, in one of his rules, penned down that every fourth Shreepujya (lead acharya) who is bestowed the virtuous position will be called Jinachandra Sūri, and this 1000 year old tradition is still being followed even now.

Jinavallabha realised the difference between texts and words of teachers and put emphasis on sacred texts in Kharatara doctrine in the eleventh century. He wrote the Crown of Assembly.

The following four are known as Dada Guru in the sect and are venerated as spiritual guides.

 Jinadatta Sūri (1075-1154 CE), is the most famous ascetic of Gaccha who won converts in Sindh. After his death at Ajmer, a monument was erected there and the place is known as Dadabari.
 Maṇidhārī Jinachandra Sūri (1140-1166 CE)
 Jinakushal Sūri (1279–1331) gained many converts in western India.
 Jinachandra Sūri II (1537–1612) visited Lahore in 1591, where he convinced Akbar to stop Muslim attack on Jain temples.

Doctrines
Kharatara ascetics regard their practices as scripturally correct. They follow basic Shvetambara canon and works of other Kharatara teachers.

Adherents
Ascetics: 193 nuns, 19 monks in 1986  or 50-75 monks and 300 nuns  Large number of its lay followers reside in Rajasthan and West Bengal states of India.

Literary contributions 

Several members of Kharatara Gaccha were notable writers:

 Abhayachandra (before 1500 CE), a pupil of Ananda-raya, wrote a Prakrit-language astrological treatise titled Ulluntha-vadi-mukha-kilaka.
 Kshama-kalyana, a pupil of Amrta-dharma, wrote Dvadasha-masa-vyakhyana
 Jina-prabha-suri (c. 1261-1333) wrote a number of works, including the Vividha Tirtha Kalpa
 Jina-ratna-suri (13th century) wrote Lilavati-sara

See also
 Tapa Gaccha
 Tristutik Gaccha
 Jain schools and branches

References

Śvētāmbara sects